The Jamaica men's national field hockey team represents Jamaica in international field hockey competitions.

Tournament history

Pan American Games
1967 – 5th place
1971 – 6th place
1975 – 4th place
1979 – 8th place
1987 – 9th place
1991 – 9th place

Pan American Cup
2000 – 11th place

Central American and Caribbean Games
 1982 – 5th place
 1990 – 5th place
 1998 – 6th place
 2002 – 6th place
 2010 – 7th place
 2014 – 6th place
 2018 – 6th place
 2023 – Qualified

Hockey World League
 2014–15 – Did Not Rank

See also
Jamaica women's national field hockey team

References

Field hockey
Americas men's national field hockey teams
national team